George Howard Ferguson, PC (June 18, 1870 – February 21, 1946) was the ninth premier of Ontario, from 1923 to 1930. He was a Conservative member of the Legislative Assembly of Ontario from 1905 to 1930 who represented the eastern provincial riding of Grenville.

Background
The son of Charles Frederick Ferguson, who served in the Canadian House of Commons, Ferguson studied at the University of Toronto and Osgoode Hall, was called to the Ontario bar in 1894, and returned to Kemptville to practise. Ferguson was elected to the municipal council and served three years as reeve of Kemptville. He married Ella Cumming in 1896.

Early political career
First elected to the Legislative Assembly of Ontario in the 1905 election, Ferguson served as Minister of Lands, Forest, and Mines in the government of William Howard Hearst from 1914 to 1919. He declared, "My ambition has been to see the largest paper industry in the world established in the Province, and my attitude towards the pulp and paper industry has been directed towards assisting in bringing this about." After becoming Premier of Ontario in 1923, Ferguson reserved a further  to Abitibi.

In addition, he sold timber limits to the Shevlin-Clarke Lumber Company (headed by the fellow Conservative James Arthur Mathieu) for less than half the price they would have normally fetched, and the company later paid a fine of $1.5 million for breaching the Crown Timber Act. The transactions were criticized in a subsequent inquiry, in which the commission reported:

Ferguson became leader of the Conservative Party upon the defeat of the Hearst government that year.

Premiership
In the 1923 election, the Ontario Conservative Party came to power under Ferguson's leadership by defeating the United Farmers of Ontario-Labour coalition government of Ernest C. Drury. The Conservatives won 75 of the 111 seats in the legislature. Ferguson's government encouraged private investment in industry and the development of the province's natural resources as a means of achieving prosperity. It was re-elected in the 1926 election with 72 seats and in 1929 with 90 seats.

French policy

In 1911, Ferguson argued in the legislature that "no language other than English should be used as a medium of instruction in the schools of this Province" although that a significant proportion of the population was French-Canadian. Sectarian politics was still rife in Ontario, and the Conservatives relied on a base of Orange support.  Ferguson was prepared to pander to the Orangemen with anti-Catholic and anti-French rhetoric.

In 1912, the Ontario government passed Regulation 17, which greatly restricted the use of French language instruction. The legislation outraged Quebec and was an irritant to national unity during the First World War. When Ferguson became premier, he reversed himself by moderating the legislation and allowing more French-language instruction. His government, however, refused to extend funding for the Catholic separate schools past Grade 8.

Ferguson's reversal on Regulation 17 was a concession needed for his alliance with Quebec Premier Louis-Alexandre Taschereau. Ferguson and Taschereau formed an axis against the federal government to demand more provincial rights and defend the provinces' ownership of natural resources such as water power (hydro-electric generation).

Liquor policy
The Ferguson government, eager for new tax revenue, held a plebiscite in 1924 to soften the province's temperance laws. A slim majority voted against prohibition, which led Ferguson's government to permit the sale of beer with an alcohol content of no more than 4.4 proof, about 2.2%. Such brew became known as Fergie's foam.

The 1926 provincial election was fought on the issue of the government's proposal to repeal the Ontario Temperance Act and to permit controlled sales of liquor in government owned stores. Attorney-General William Folger Nickle, who had supported the government's earlier decision to allow the sale of low-alcohol beer, was opposed to going any further softening of temperance laws and resigned from Cabinet to run against the government as a Prohibitionist candidate against the repeal of the law. Ferguson's Conservatives were re-elected with a slightly-reduced majority.

In 1927, the government introduced legislation to establish the Liquor Control Board of Ontario and to allow the sale of alcohol by government-owned and operated liquor stores. That moderate stance on temperance allowed the government to isolate the Liberals, who until 1930 took a hard prohibitionist stance by opposing even regulated liquor sales and so alienated all but the most hardline temperance advocates.

Other issues
The Tories remained hostile to labour and immigrants and were not prepared to provide social relief when the Great Depression threw thousands out of work and into poverty.  The Ferguson government also opposed federal government plans for an old-age pension.

Later life
In December 1930, Ferguson left provincial politics to accept an appointment as Canadian High Commissioner in London. He was succeeded as party leader and premier by George Stewart Henry.

From 1945 to 1946, he served as Chancellor of the University of Western Ontario.

He also gave his name to the Ferguson Block, a government office building at Queen's Park in Toronto as well as the residence cafeteria at University College in the University of Toronto, which is called the Howard Ferguson Dining Hall. A University College scholarship is named after him.

Ferguson died on February 21, 1946, in Toronto.

References

Further reading

Bibliography
Oliver, Peter. G. Howard Ferguson : Ontario Tory. Toronto : University of Toronto Press, 1977.
Oliver, Peter. Public & private persons : the Ontario political culture 1914–1934. Toronto  : Clarke Irwin, 1975.
Chambers, EJ Canadian Parliamentary Guide, 1916

Other

External links 
 
 Howard Ferguson fonds, Archives of Ontario

1870 births
1946 deaths
Premiers of Ontario
Leaders of the Progressive Conservative Party of Ontario
Chancellors of the University of Western Ontario
High Commissioners of Canada to the United Kingdom
Canadian Anglicans
University of Toronto alumni